Władysław Raczkowski (19 May 1893 in Wartkowice, Congress Poland – 1 July 1959 in Łódź) was a Polish conductor and composer.

References
Entry in the Encyklopedia muzyki PWN (in Polish)

1893 births
1959 deaths
Polish conductors (music)
Male conductors (music)
Polish composers
20th-century classical composers
20th-century conductors (music)
Polish male classical composers
20th-century male musicians
People from Poddębice County